Everyone Loves You... Once You Leave Them is the seventh studio album by Australian metalcore band the Amity Affliction. It was released on 21 February 2020 through Pure Noise Records and was produced by Matt Squire. It is the band's first album release with the label. It is also the first album to feature new drummer Joe Longobardi as official band member, who replaced Ryan Burt due to his mental health reasons on 5 February 2018. Additionally, Longobardi also performed as a session drummer on the band's sixth studio album Misery.

Background and promotion
On 6 September 2019, the band released their new song, "All My Friends Are Dead" accompanied with a music video. The song marks a return to the band's heavier elements; it is their first release under Pure Noise Records. On 31 December, it was revealed that the band would be releasing their new album on 21 February after the German version of Amazon accidentally leaked the product listing for the effort. The band have also released a sneak peek of an upcoming track from the album.

On 8 January 2020, the band officially confirmed that Everyone Loves You... Once You Leave Them set for a 21 February release date along with unveiling the track list for the album. Along with the confirmation of their forthcoming album they released their second single from the outing, "Soak Me in Bleach" accompanied with a music video.

On 29 January, the band released the next single from their forthcoming album titled "Catatonia" which harks back to their earlier heavy days. On 20 October, the band released two B-Side songs that didn't make it on their seventh album called "Midnight Train" and "Don't Wade in the Water".

Critical reception

The album received polarized reviews from critics. Carlos Zelaya from Dead Press! rated the album negatively, stating: "If The Amity Affliction's mission statement is to induce even more self-hatred within yourself when you listen to them, then fair enough. [...] There are much, much better things to do with your time instead of inflicting this dismal, dreadful album upon yourself." Distorted Sound scored the album 8 out of 10, and said: "New drummer Joe Longobardi has really submerged himself into the band, supplying some amazing prominent rhythms which give the tracks that needed impact and depth. The guitar riffs from Dan Brown and bass from Ahren Stringer are both distinguished, and make for an album that the band should be proud of. Overall, Everyone Loves You… Once You Leave Them has really shown that THE AMITY AFFLICTION are determined to give the fans what they want, whilst also staying true to the vision they have for where they are going in the future." Kerrang! gave the album 3 out of 5, and stated: "It all adds up to an album that doesn't consistently hang together or deliver quite the knockout blows it feels like it should. When they get everything just right, though, here we find some of the best material The Amity Affliction have produced in ages. Coming both so long into their career and following such a left-turn as the last time we saw them, that's a welcome thing indeed."

Alex Sievers from KillYourStereo gave the album 30 out of 100, and said: "Just like a small child throwing on a white sheet to pretend to be a ghost to try and scare all of the grown-ups, I don't take this album seriously at all. Everyone Loves You… Once You Leave Them is a hodgepodge record of what The Amity Affliction has done hitherto; [...] It's the worst parts of Misery frankensteined together with the weakest aspects of what their last few records before that were doing [...] would you say that you liked a two-hour-film when you only enjoyed less than 20 minutes of it? No, exactly, you wouldn't." A reviewer for Rock 'N' Load praised the album, saying, "Everyone Loves You… brings back the heaviness that made the bands early work feel so genuine, while keeping elements of the later sounds that show Amity's growth as musicians across their careers." Wall of Sound scored the album 8.5/10, saying: "If you love Amity's heavier tunes from way back in the day OR if you only jumped on the bandwagon with Misery, there's bound to be something on this album that'll not only catch your attention, but draw you in closer than ever before..."

Track listing

Personnel
The Amity Affliction
 Joel Birch – lead vocals
 Ahren Stringer – co-lead vocals, bass
 Dan Brown – guitars, backing vocals
 Joe Longobardi – drums, percussion

Additional personnel
 Matt Squire – production

Charts

Weekly charts

Year-end charts

References

2020 albums
Albums produced by Matt Squire
The Amity Affliction albums
Pure Noise Records albums